Bahia gubernatorial election, 1994 was held in the Brazilian state of Bahia on October 3, alongside Brazil's general election, with a second round on November 15. PFL candidate, Paulo Souto, was elected on November 15, 1994.

References 

1994 Brazilian gubernatorial elections
October 1994 events in South America

1994